Apsarassu is a 1990 Indian Malayalam film, directed by K. S. Gopalakrishnan. The film has musical score by S. P. Venkatesh.

Cast

Soundtrack
The music was composed by S. P. Venkatesh and the lyrics were written by Bharanikkavu Sivakumar.

References

External links
 

1990 films
1990s Malayalam-language films